"Vincent" is a song by German singer Sarah Connor, released on 5 April 2019 by Polydor Records as the lead single from her tenth studio album Herz Kraft Werke. It was released along with the album announcement. Connor co-wrote the song with Peter Plate and Ulf Sommer.

Background
Connor wrote the track after hearing from a mother that her teenage son had come out as gay. She said that the song "stands symbolically for all boys and girls in puberty, in search of orientation and identity". The name is fictitious.

Critical and commercial reception
Idolator called the track a "soaring pop anthem".

On 12 April 2019 "Vincent" debuted in the German charts at number 29 before dropping down to number 77 by the middle of May, by which time the song had been censored or banned by some radio stations on account of the sexual content of its opening lyrics.  Consistent with the Streisand effect the song subsequently rose to a peak position of number 9 as the track remained in the German charts for the rest of 2019.

Promotion
Connor announced the track on her Instagram in early April 2019.

Charts

Weekly charts

Year-end charts

Certifications

References

2019 singles
2019 songs
German-language songs
LGBT-related songs
Polydor Records singles
Sarah Connor (singer) songs
Songs written by Peter Plate
Songs written by Sarah Connor (singer)
Songs written by Ulf Leo Sommer